Balda Canyon Natural Monument is an Abasha gorge  located in Samegrelo region of Western Georgia in Martvili Municipality near village Second Balda and Balda Monastery of St. Mary's Assumption, 295 meters above sea level.
Canyon created by limestone rocks in the southern part of the Ashkah massif by the Abasha River. Baldi Canyon is 1400 m long, 5-10 m wide and 25-30 m deep.

See also 
 List of natural monuments of Georgia
Abasha (river)
River Abasha Waterfall Natural Monument
Gachedili Canyon Natural Monument

References

Natural monuments of Georgia (country)
Canyons and gorges of Georgia (country)
Geography of Samegrelo-Zemo Svaneti
Protected areas established in 2013
2013 establishments in Georgia (country)